Mastermind or Master Mind  is a code-breaking game for two players. It resembles an earlier pencil and paper game called Bulls and Cows that may date back a century.

Gameplay and rules
The game is played using:
 a decoding board, with a shield at one end covering a row of four large holes, and twelve (or ten, or eight, or six) additional rows containing four large holes next to a set of four small holes;
 code pegs of six different colors (or more; see Variations below), with round heads, which will be placed in the large holes on the board; and
 key pegs, some colored (red in the image, though often black) and some white, which are flat-headed and smaller than the code pegs; they will be placed in the small holes on the board.
The two players decide in advance how many games they will play, which must be an even number. One player becomes the codemaker, the other the codebreaker. The codemaker chooses a pattern of four code pegs. Players decide in advance whether duplicates and blanks are allowed. If so, the codemaker may even choose four same-colored code pegs or four blanks. If blanks are not allowed in the code, the codebreaker may not use blanks in their guesses. The codemaker places the chosen pattern in the four holes covered by the shield, visible to the codemaker but not to the codebreaker.

The codebreaker tries to guess the pattern, in both order and color, within eight to twelve turns. Each guess is made by placing a row of code pegs on the decoding board. Once placed, the codemaker provides feedback by placing from zero to four key pegs in the small holes of the row with the guess. A colored key peg is placed for each code peg from the guess which is correct in both color and position. A white key peg indicates the existence of a correct color code peg placed in the wrong position.

If there are duplicate colors in the guess, they cannot all be awarded a key peg unless they correspond to the same number of duplicate colors in the hidden code. For example, if the hidden code is red-red-blue-blue and the player guesses red-red-red-blue, the codemaker will award two colored key pegs for the two correct reds, nothing for the third red as there is not a third red in the code, and a colored key peg for the blue. No indication is given of the fact that the code also includes a second blue.

Once feedback is provided, another guess is made; guesses and feedback continue to alternate until either the codebreaker guesses correctly, or all rows on the decoding board are full.

Traditionally, players can only earn points when playing as the codemaker. The codemaker gets one point for each guess the codebreaker makes. An extra point is earned by the codemaker if the codebreaker is unable to guess the exact pattern within the given number of turns. (An alternative is to score based on the number of key pegs placed.) The winner is the one who has the most points after the agreed-upon number of games are played.

Other rules may be specified.

History

The game is based on an older, paper based game called Bulls and Cows. A computer adaptation of it was run in the 1960s on Cambridge University’s Titan computer system, where it was called 'MOO'. This version was written by Frank King. There was also another version for the TSS/8 time sharing system, written by J.S. Felton and finally a version for the Multics system at MIT by Jerrold Grochow.

The modern game with pegs was invented in 1970 by Mordecai Meirowitz, an Israeli postmaster and telecommunications expert. Meirowitz presented the idea to many major toy companies but, after showing it at the Nuremberg International Toy Fair, it was picked up by a plastics company, Invicta Plastics, based near Leicester, UK. Invicta purchased all the rights to the game and the founder, Edward Jones-Fenleigh, refined the game further. It was released in 1971–2.

Since 1971, the rights to Mastermind have been held by Invicta Plastics. (Invicta always named the game Master Mind.) They originally manufactured it themselves, though they have since licensed its manufacture to Hasbro worldwide, with the exception of Pressman Toys and Orda Industries who have the manufacturing rights to the United States and Israel, respectively.

Starting in 1973, the game box featured a photograph of a man in a suit jacket seated in the foreground, with a young Asian woman standing behind him. The two amateur models (Bill Woodward and Cecilia Fung) reunited in June 2003 to pose for another publicity photo.

Algorithms and strategies
Before asking for a best strategy of the codebreaker one has to define what is the meaning of "best": The minimal number of moves can be analyzed under the conditions of worst and average case and in the sense of a minimax value of a zero-sum game in game theory.

Best strategies with four pegs and six colors
With four pegs and six colors, there are 64 = 1,296 different patterns (allowing duplicate colors).

Worst case: Five-guess algorithm

In 1977, Donald Knuth demonstrated that the codebreaker can solve the pattern in five moves or fewer, using an algorithm that progressively reduces the number of possible patterns.
The algorithm works as follows:

 Create the set  of 1,296 possible codes {1111, 1112, ... 6665, 6666}.
 Start with initial guess 1122. (Knuth gives examples showing that this algorithm using first guesses other than "two pair"; such as 1111, 1112, 1123, or 1234; does not win in five tries on every code.)
 Play the guess to get a response of colored and white pegs.
 If the response is four colored pegs, the game is won, the algorithm terminates.
 Otherwise, remove from  any code that would not give the same response.
 The next guess is chosen by the minimax technique, which chooses a guess that has the least worst response score.  In this case, a response to a guess is some number of colored and white pegs, and the score of such a response is defined to be the number of codes in  that are still possible even after the response is known.  The score of a guess is pessimistically defined to be the worst (maximum) of all its response scores.  From the set of guesses with the least (minimum) guess score, select one as the next guess, choosing a code from  whenever possible.  (Within these constraints, Knuth follows the convention of choosing the guess with the least numeric value; e.g., 2345 is lower than 3456. Knuth also gives an example showing that in some cases no code from  will be among the best scoring guesses and thus the guess cannot win on the next turn, yet will be necessary to assure a win in five.)
 Repeat from step 3.

Average case
Subsequent mathematicians have been finding various algorithms that reduce the average number of turns needed to solve the pattern: in 1993, Kenji Koyama and Tony W. Lai performed an exhaustive depth-first search showing that the optimal method for solving a random code could achieve an average of 5,625/1,296 = 4.3403 turns to solve, with a worst-case scenario of six turns.

Minimax value of game theory
The minimax value in the sense of game theory is 5,600/1,290 = 4.3411. The minimax strategy of the codemaker consists in a uniformly distributed selection of one of the 1,290 patterns with two or more colors.

Genetic algorithm
A new algorithm with an embedded genetic algorithm, where a large set of eligible codes is collected throughout the different generations. The quality of each of these codes is determined based on a comparison with a selection of elements of the eligible set. This algorithm is based on a heuristic that assigns a score to each eligible combination based on its probability of actually being the hidden combination. Since this combination is not known, the score is based on characteristics of the set of eligible solutions or the sample of them found by the evolutionary algorithm.

The algorithm works as follows, with P = length of the solution used in the game, X1 = exact matches ("red pins") and Y1 = 
near matches ("white pins"):
 Set i = 1
 Play fixed initial guess G1
 Get the response X1 and Y1
 Repeat while Xi ≠ P:
 Increment i
 Set Ei = ∅ and h = 1
 Initialize population
 Repeat while h ≤ maxgen and |Ei| ≤ maxsize:
 Generate new population using crossover, mutation, inversion and permutation
 Calculate fitness
 Add eligible combinations to Ei
 Increment h
 Play guess Gi which belongs to Ei
 Get response Xi and Yi

Complexity and the satisfiability problem

In November 2004, Michiel de Bondt proved that solving a Mastermind board is an NP-complete problem when played with n pegs per row and two colors, by showing how to represent any one-in-three 3SAT problem in it. He also showed the same for Consistent Mastermind (playing the game so that every guess is a candidate for the secret code that is consistent with the hints in the previous guesses).

The Mastermind satisfiability problem is a decision problem that asks, "Given a set of guesses and the number of colored and white pegs scored for each guess, is there at least one secret pattern that generates those exact scores?"  (If not, then the codemaker must have incorrectly scored at least one guess.) In December 2005, Jeff Stuckman and Guo-Qiang Zhang showed in an arXiv article that the Mastermind satisfiability problem is NP-complete.

Variations
Varying the number of colors and the number of holes results in a spectrum of Mastermind games of different levels of difficulty.  Another common variation is to support different numbers of players taking on the roles of codemaker and codebreaker.  The following are some examples of Mastermind games produced by Invicta, Parker Brothers, Pressman, Hasbro, and other game manufacturers:

The difficulty level of any of the above can be increased by treating “empty” as an additional color or decreased by requiring only that the code's colors be guessed, independent of position. In Mini Mastermind the colored code pegs are the same size and shape as the colored or white key pegs so the difficulty can be increased by permitting the key pegs to be used as code pegs for two additional colors.

Computer and Internet versions of the game have also been made, sometimes with variations in the number and type of pieces involved and often under different names to avoid trademark infringement. Mastermind can also be played with paper and pencil.
There is a numeral variety of the Mastermind in which a 4-digit number is guessed. The 2021 web game Wordle has been compared to Mastermind.

The game was included in the compilation party video game Clubhouse Games: 51 Worldwide Classics for the Nintendo Switch under the name "Hit & Blow".

Reviews
Games and Puzzles
1980 Games 100 in Games
 1981 Games 100 in Games
Games & Puzzles

See also
 Israeli inventions and discoveries

Explanatory notes

References

External links
 Mastermind: An augment reality approach, Porting a Legacy Game to New Interaction Paradigm
 Mathworld article on Mastermind
 Optimal Solution Look-Up Table on Mastermind

Board games introduced in 1970
1970s toys
Abstract strategy games
Games of mental skill
Logic puzzles
NP-complete problems
Deduction board games
Parker Brothers games
Pressman Toy Corporation games
Guessing games

ru:Быки и коровы